Henrietta Csiszár (born 15 May 1994 in Hajdúnánás) is a Hungarian football midfielder currently playing in the Serie A Femminile for Inter Milan. She is the captain of the Hungarian national team.

Career statistics

Club

International goals

References

1994 births
Living people
Hungarian women's footballers
Hungary women's international footballers
Ferencvárosi TC (women) footballers
MTK Hungária FC (women) players
People from Hajdúnánás
Women's association football midfielders
Hungarian expatriate sportspeople in Germany
Expatriate women's footballers in Germany
Bayer 04 Leverkusen (women) players
Inter Milan (women) players
Serie A (women's football) players
Expatriate women's footballers in Italy
Hungarian expatriate sportspeople in Italy
FIFA Century Club
Sportspeople from Hajdú-Bihar County
21st-century Hungarian women